Edwin E. Cull  (1891–1956) was an American architect in practice in Providence, Rhode Island, from 1921 to 1956. In 1946 he was founder of what is now the Robinson Green Beretta Corporation, one of the largest architecture firms in Rhode Island.

Life and career
Edwin Emory Cull was born October 8, 1891, in Providence, Rhode Island, to James Aloysius Cull and Mary Ella (Mosher) Cull. He was educated in the public schools and at the Rhode Island School of Design with supplementary study at Cornell University. After leaving Cornell in 1918 he joined the United States Army for the duration of World War I. After being discharged at Houston Cull worked for an engineering firm in that city. He returned to Providence in 1920, and in 1921 bought out the practice of architect T. Clarence Herrmann and began to practice for himself. During this period Cull specialized in the design of private homes in traditional styles, especially on the East Side. Cull closed his office in 1943 to join the war effort, serving as a consultant to the War Production Board.

After the war, in 1945, he joined manufacturers Arnold, Hoffman & Company as their chief architectural engineer, leaving after about a year to return to private practice. In 1946 he formed the firm of Cull & Robinson in partnership with Knight D. Robinson, which expanded in 1953 to include associate Conrad E. Green. Robinson and Green had both studied at Harvard Graduate School of Design under Walter Gropius and introduced Bauhaus and modernist influences into the firm's work. Green was made a full partner in 1955, and the firm of Cull, Robinson & Green continued until Cull's death in 1956.

Robinson and Green then added a third partner, Joseph A. Beretta, to form the reorganized Robinson, Green & Beretta. In 1970 the partnership was incorporated as the Robinson Green Beretta Corporation, which it remains in 2023.

Cull joined the American Institute of Architects in 1930 and served as Rhode Island chapter president.

Personal life
Cull was married in 1923 to Natalie Elizabeth Holm and had two children. Cull lived in Providence and died March 19, 1956, in Cranston, Rhode Island, at the age of 64.

Architectural works
Edwin E. Cull, 1921-1942:
 Daniel Drake-Smith house, 23 Taylors Ln S, Little Compton, Rhode Island (1928)
 John J. Banigan house, 21 Harwich Rd, Providence, Rhode Island (1929)
 Edmund J. Sullivan house, 45 Balton Rd, Providence, Rhode Island (1931–32)
 Animal Husbandry Building, University of Rhode Island, Kingston, Rhode Island (1935, demolished)
 Alice H. Moran house, 460 Blackstone Blvd, Providence, Rhode Island (1935)
 Administration Building, Eleanor Slater Hospital, Howard, Rhode Island (1936)
 Howard R. Merriman house, 41 Taylors Ln, Little Compton, Rhode Island (1938)
Cull & Robinson, 1947-1954:
 Adolph Meyer Building, Eleanor Slater Hospital, Howard, Rhode Island (1949)
 Robert S. Davis house, 11 Abbottsford Ct, Providence, Rhode Island (1950)
 First Federal Savings and Loan Association Building, 110 Westminster St, Providence, Rhode Island (1953, demolished 2005)
 Vartan Gregorian Elementary School, 455 Wickenden St, Providence, Rhode Island (1954)
Cull, Robinson & Green, 1955-1956:
 Roger Freeman Jr. house, 57 Hazard Ave, Providence, Rhode Island (1955–56)
 A. Merrill Percelay house, 22 Bedford Rd, Pawtucket, Rhode Island (1955)
 Rhode Island Yacht Club, 1 Ocean Ave, Cranston, Rhode Island (1956)

Notes

References

1891 births
1956 deaths
20th-century American architects
Rhode Island School of Design alumni
Cornell University alumni
Architects from Providence, Rhode Island